Watertown is a city in Middlesex County, Massachusetts, part of Greater Boston. The population was 35,329 in the 2020 census. Its neighborhoods include Bemis, Coolidge Square, East Watertown, Watertown Square, and the West End.

Watertown was one of the first Massachusetts Bay Colony settlements organized by Puritan settlers in 1630. The city is home to the Perkins School for the Blind, the Armenian Library and Museum of America, and the historic Watertown Arsenal, which produced military armaments from 1816 through World War II.

History 

Archeological evidence suggests that Watertown was inhabited for thousands of years before colonization. In the 1600s, two groups of Massachusett, the Pequossette and the Nonantum, had settlements on the banks of the river later called the Charles, and a contemporary source lists "Pigsgusset" as the native name of "Water towne." The Pequossette built a fishing weir to trap herring at the site of the current Watertown Dam. The annual fish migration, as both alewife and blueback herring swim upstream from their adult home in the sea to spawn in the fresh water where they were hatched, still occurs every spring.

Watertown, first known to settlers as Saltonstall Plantation, was one of the earliest of the Massachusetts Bay Colony settlements. Founded in early 1630 by a group of settlers led by Richard Saltonstall and George Phillips, it was officially incorporated that same year. The alternate spelling "Waterton" is seen in some early documents.

The first buildings were upon land now included within the limits of Cambridge known as Gerry's Landing. For its first quarter century Watertown ranked next to Boston in population and area. Since then its limits have been greatly reduced. Thrice portions have been added to Cambridge, and it has contributed territory to form the new towns of Weston (1712), Waltham (1738), Lincoln (1754) and Belmont (1859). In 1632 the residents of Watertown protested against being compelled to pay a tax for the erection of a stockade fort at Cambridge; this was the first protest in America against taxation without representation and led to the establishment of representative democracy in the colony. As early as the close of the 17th century, Watertown was the chief horse and cattle market in New England and was known for its fertile gardens and fine estates. Here about 1632 was erected the first gristmill in the colony, and in 1662 one of the first woolen mills in America was built here. The first burying ground, on Arlington Street, was established in the 1660s. It contains a monument to Joseph Coolidge, the only Watertown resident killed during the British retreat from Concord in April 1775.

Revolutionary War era

Much excitement was generated in Watertown towards the start of the American Revolutionary War period. In 1773, many of its citizens were engaged with the Sons of Liberty in another tax protest, this time against the British Tea Tax which resulted in the famous Boston Tea Party protest.

Then later (April 1775), some 134 Watertown minutemen responded to the alarm from Lexington to rout the British soldiers from their march to Concord. Thereafter many of these citizen soldiers were part of the first battle line formed at the Siege of Boston. Another Watertown citizen, Israel Bissel, was the first rider to take the news of the British attack and rode all the way to Connecticut, New York and Philadelphia.

The Massachusetts Provincial Congress, after adjournment from Concord, met from April to July 1775 in the First Parish Church, the site of which is marked by a monument. On July 3, George Washington was greeted in Watertown; the following day he took command of the Army in Cambridge. The Massachusetts General Court held its sessions here from 1775 to 1778. Committees met in the nearby Edmund Fowle House. Boston town meetings were held here during the siege of Boston, when many Boston families made their homes in the neighborhood. For several months early in the American Revolution the committees of safety and committee of correspondence made Watertown their headquarters and it was from here that General Joseph Warren set out for Bunker Hill.

The Treaty of Watertown, the first treaty signed between the newly formed United States of America and a foreign power, the St. John's and Mi'kmaq First Nations of Nova Scotia, was signed in this house.

The Coolidge Tavern, built in 1742, was frequented by minutemen during the war. Here, Washington was entertained on his New England tour in 1789. The tavern was demolished in 1918 to make way for a trolley terminal.

Industrial era 

From 1832 to 1834 Theodore Parker conducted a private school and his name is still preserved in the Parker School, though the building no longer operates as a public school.

Mount Auburn Cemetery was founded in 1831, creating the first garden cemetery in the United States.  The landscape of Mount Auburn provided inspiration for the nation's first public parks and picturesque suburbs designed by the early generations of American landscape architects.  Mount Auburn has been recognized as one of the most significant designed landscapes in the country. Although perceived as a Cambridge institution, almost all of the cemetery is actually in Watertown.

The Watertown Arsenal operated continuously as a military munitions and research facility from 1816 until 1995, when the Army sold the property, by then known as the Army Materials Technology Laboratory, to the town of Watertown. The Arsenal is notable for being the site of a 1911 strike prompted by the management methods of operations research pioneer Frederick Winslow Taylor (Taylor and 1911 Watertown Arsenal Strike). Taylor's method, which he dubbed "Scientific Management," broke tasks down into smaller components. Workers no longer completed whole items; instead, they were timed using stopwatches as they did small tasks repetitively, as Taylor attempted to find the balance of tasks that resulted in the maximum output from workers. The strike and its causes were controversial enough that they resulted in Congressional hearings in 1911; Congress passed a law in 1915 banning the method in government owned arsenals. Taylor's methods spread widely, influencing such industrialists as Henry Ford, and the idea is one of the underlying inspirations of the factory (assembly) line industrial method. The Watertown Arsenal was the site of a major superfund clean-up in the 1990s, and has now become a center for shopping, dining and the arts, with the opening of several restaurants and a new theatre. The site includes the Arsenal Center for the Arts, a regional arts center that opened in 2005. The Arsenal is now owned by athenahealth. Arsenal Street features two shopping malls across the street from one another, with the Watertown Mall on one side and Arsenal Yards on the other.

The Stanley Brothers built the first of their steam-powered cars, which came to be known as Stanley Steamers, in Watertown in 1897.

The Locomobile Company of America, founded in 1899, also produced steam-powered cars in Watertown until the company moved to Bridgeport, Connecticut.

21st Century 
Shortly after midnight of April 18–19, 2013, the two suspects in the Boston Marathon bombing engaged in a protracted battle with police, in Watertown involving the use of firearms and explosives. Tamerlan Tsarnaev was critically wounded and later pronounced dead and the town was completely locked down for hours as police, FBI, and Army National Guard personnel patrolled it, looking for the remaining suspect, Dzhokhar Tsarnaev, who was captured wounded but alive in a boat shortly after the lockdown ended on the following evening.

Geography
Watertown is located at  (42.37139, −71.18194). To the north, it is bordered by the town of Belmont, along Belmont Street; to the south, it is bordered by Newton and Brighton—the border being largely formed by the Charles River. In Watertown Square, the nexus of the town, the town's border extends south of the Charles to encompass the neighborhood surrounding Casey Playground. To the east lies the City of Cambridge, the border to which is almost entirely the well-known Mount Auburn Cemetery, most of which is actually in Watertown (though commonly believed to be in Cambridge). To the west lies the more expansive city of Waltham, but there is no distinct geographic feature dividing the two municipalities.

Adjacent cities and towns

Demographics

As of the census of 2000, there were 32,986 people, 14,629 households, and 7,329 families residing in the city. The racial makeup of the city was 91.42% White, 1.73% African American, 0.16% Native American, 3.87% Asian, 0.02% Pacific Islander, 0.85% from other races, and 1.95% from two or more races. Hispanic or Latino of any race were 2.68% of the population.

There were 14,629 households, out of which 17.8% had children under the age of 18 living with them, 37.9% were married couples living together, 8.7% had a female householder with no husband present, and 49.9% were non-families. 34.1% of all households were made up of individuals, and 12.4% had someone living alone who was 65 years of age or older. The average household size was 2.17 and the average family size was 2.86.

In the city, the population was spread out, with 14.1% under the age of 18, 9.4% from 18 to 24, 39.8% from 25 to 44, 20.0% from 45 to 64, and 16.7% who were 65 years of age or older. The median age was 37 years. For every 100 females, there were 86.1 males. For every 100 females age 18 and over, there were 83.8 males.

The median income for a household in the city was $59,764, and the median income for a family was $67,441. Males had a median income of $46,642 versus $39,840 for females. The per capita income for the city was $33,262. About 4.5% of families and 6.3% of the population were below the poverty line, including 8.6% of those under age 18 and 7.5% of those age 65 or over.

Armenian population

Watertown is a major center of the Armenian diaspora in the United States, with the third-largest Armenian community in the United States, estimated as numbering 7,000 to over 8,000 as of 2007. Watertown ranks only behind the California cities of Glendale and Fresno.
Watertown is also the venue for the publication of long-running Armenian newspapers in English and Armenian, including:
 Baikar Association Inc.'s
 Armenian Mirror-Spectator
 Baikar
 Hairenik Association Inc.'s
 Armenian Weekly
 Հայրենիք (Hairenik Weekly)
 Armenian Review
 Hairenik Association also runs a web radio and a web TV station.

Economy 
Major employers based in Watertown include the Tufts Health Plan, New England Sports Network, the Perkins School for the Blind, Sasaki, Exergen Corporation, Harvard Business Publishing, Vanasse Hangen Brustlin, Inc., Bright Horizons Family Solutions, and athenahealth.

Transportation 
Watertown borders Soldiers Field Road and the Massachusetts Turnpike, major arteries into downtown Boston.  Watertown is served by several MBTA bus and formerly trackless trolley routes.  Most of them pass through or terminate in Watertown Square or Watertown Yard.  The former A-Watertown branch of the MBTA's Green Line ran to Watertown until 1969.

Education 
Public schooling is provided for approximately 2,600 students by Watertown Public Schools, which operates three elementary schools, one middle school, and one high school (Watertown High School).

Private day schools:
 Perkins School
 St. Stephen's Armenian Elementary School

It originated as a solely Eastern Armenian supplementary school established in 1988 by the Armenian Society of Boston (Iranahye Miutyun); it was Greater Boston's first Eastern Armenian supplementary school. It became church-affiliated in 2015, and it merged with a Western Armenian school, St. Sahag & St. Mesrob Armenian School, in September of that year.

Notable people

 George Bachrach, State Senator representing Greater Boston Area; Democratic candidate for Governor in 1994 and 1998
 Richard Bakalyan (1931–2015), actor
 Outram Bangs (1863–1932), zoologist
 Seth Bemis (1775–1851), industrialist and entrepreneur
 Hampartzoum Berberian (1905–1999), Armenian composer
 Charles Brigham (1841–1925), nationally known architect and designer of the Watertown town seal
 Benjamin Robbins Curtis (1809–1874), American jurist. Dissented in the Dred Scott case and defended Andrew Johnson during the president's impeachment trial
 Frederick C. Crawford (1891–1994), American industrialist, founder of TRW and Crawford Auto-Aviation Museum
 Jeff DaRosa (born 1982), musician, member of Dropkick Murphys and former member of the Exit
 James DeMarco (born 1968), artist and cartoonist
 Eliza Dushku (born 1980), film and TV actress, grew up in Watertown and graduated from Watertown High School
 Convers Francis (1795–1863), minister ordained at the Watertown Unitarian Church, who, along with Ralph Waldo Emerson, Henry David Thoreau and others, had an important role in transcendentalism
 Eugene Goodheart (1931–2020), literary critic at Brandeis University
 Hrach Gregorian (born 1949) Political consultant, educator, and writer in the field of post-conflict peacebuilding
 Thomas Hastings (colonist) (–1685), English immigrant ancestor of Rev. Theodore Parker, among others
 Charles Foster Hathaway, founder of C.F. Hathaway Company shirt company
 Harriet Hosmer (painter & sculptor), (1830–1908) known as the first female professional sculptor
 Drastamat Kanayan, better known as Dro (Դրօ), was an Armenian military commander and politician, a member of the Armenian Revolutionary Federation. He served as Defense Minister of Armenia in 1920, during the country's brief independence. Dro died in Watertown on March 8, 1956, and was buried at Mount Auburn Cemetery
 Rachel Kaprielian, former head of Massachusetts Registry of Motor Vehicles, and former state representative
 Hakob Karapents (1925–1994), Iranian-Armenian writer
 Helen Keller (1880–1968), attended the Perkins Institute for the Blind
 Tim Kurkjian, Major League Baseball analyst on ESPN
 Nancy Masterton, Maine state representative
 Thomas Mayhew, early settler and Governor of Martha's Vineyard, Nantucket and adjacent islands
 Ross Miner (born 1991), skating coach and retired competitive figure skater
 Stephen P. Mugar (1901–1982), founder of Star Market, philanthropist
 John Oldham (1592–1636), early Puritan settler
 Charles Pratt (1830–1891), wealthy oil industry pioneer and philanthropist
 Thomas Reilly, Massachusetts attorney general (1999–2007)
 Robert Seeley (1602–1668), co-founder of Watertown, landowner
 Charles Sumner Tainter (1854–1940), inventor, associate and nephew of Alexander Graham Bell
 Warren Tolman, Democratic candidate for Lt. Governor in 1998, Governor in 2002 and Attorney General in 2014
 Steven Van Zandt (born 1950), guitarist of Springsteen's E-Street Band, actor from The Sopranos, lived at 16 Edgecliff Road until the age of seven

Culture

 Armenian Library and Museum of America at 65 Main Street in the former Coolidge Bank building
 Hairenik Association at 80 Bigelow Avenue
 Perkins Braille and Talking Book Library, on the campus of the Perkins School for the Blind
 Watertown Free Public Library at 123 Main Street, in a newly renovated and expanded building
The Mosesian Center for the Arts is a regional arts center located in the former US Army Arsenal along the Charles River. Offerings include visual and performing arts productions, classes, and workshops for all ages, literary/art discussions, and world-class theatrical and musical performances.
 New Repertory Theatre is the resident professional theatre company at the Mosesian Center for the Arts, 321 Arsenal Street
 The Watertown Children's Theatre at the Mosesian Center for the Arts has been offering classes and productions for children in the area for 35 years.
 The Plumbing Museum, located at 80 Rosedale Road in a former ice house next to the J.C. Cannistraro corporate offices. (Temporarily closed while searching for a new location.)
 The Edmund Fowle House (1772) and Museum, at 28 Marshall St., the second oldest surviving house in Watertown (after the Browne House)
 The Abraham Browne House (built ) is a colonial house located at 562 Main Street. It is now a nonprofit museum operated by Historic New England and open to the public two afternoons a year.
 Mount Auburn Cemetery, founded in 1831, consists of 151.1 acres of well manicured grounds with numerous species of both indigenous and exotic tree and shrub species. It is Watertown's largest contiguous open space and extends into Cambridge to the east. It also features the George Washington Tower. Parking is available for visitors.
 Gore Place is an early 19th-century historic house museum and National Historic Landmark in Waltham, Massachusetts, with 31.6 acres of the 45-acre estate located in Watertown.
 The Watertown Arsenal was a major American arsenal located on the northern shore of the Charles River in Watertown. Its site is now registered on the ASCE's List of Historic Civil Engineering Landmarks and on the U.S. National Register of Historic Places.

See also
 Greater Boston
 Town council
 Robert Seeley
 Watertown Branch Railroad

References

Further reading
 1871 Atlas of Massachusetts. by Wall & Gray.  Map of Massachusetts. Map of Middlesex County.
 History of Middlesex County, Massachusetts,  Volume 1 (A-H), Volume 2 (L-W) compiled by Samuel Adams Drake, published 1879–1880.
 Watertown article by Francis S. Drake in volume 2, pages 433–460.
 An Historical Sketch of Watertown, in Massachusetts, by Convers Francis, published in 1830.
 Bond, Dr. Henry, Genealogies of Watertown, Massachusetts, Boston: Higginson Book Company (undated modern reprint of 1860 edition).
 Thompson, Roger, Divided We Stand, Watertown, Massachusetts 1630–1680, Amherst: University of Massachusetts Press, 2001.
 Tourtellot, Arthur B., The Charles (Rivers of America series), New York: Farrar & Rinehart, Inc., 1941.
 Fischer, David Hackett, Albion's Seed, Four British Folkways in America, New York: Oxford University Press, 1989.

External links

 Watertown official website
 Watertown History
 Zoomable view of Watertown circa 1879

 
Cities in Massachusetts
New England Puritanism
Populated places established in 1630
Armenian-American culture in Massachusetts
Armenian diaspora communities in the United States
Charles River
1630 establishments in Massachusetts
Cities in Middlesex County, Massachusetts
Boston Marathon bombing